Thomas McCreery may refer to:
* Thomas C. McCreery (1816-1890), U.S. senator from Kentucky
 Tom McCreery (1874–1941), American baseball player